
Gmina Jelcz-Laskowice is an urban-rural gmina (administrative district) in Oława County, Lower Silesian Voivodeship, in south-western Poland. It is part of the Wrocław metropolitan area.

Neighbouring gminas
Gmina Jelcz-Laskowice is bordered by the town of Oława and the gminas of Bierutów, Czernica, Lubsza, Namysłów, Oława and Oleśnica.

Villages
Apart from the town of Jelcz-Laskowice, the gmina contains the villages of Biskupice Oławskie, Brzezinki, Chwałowice, Dębina, Dziuplina, Grędzina, Kopalina, Łęg, Miłocice, Miłocice Małe, Miłoszyce, Minkowice Oławskie, Nowy Dwór, Piekary and Wójcice.

Twin towns – sister cities

Gmina Jelcz-Laskowice is twinned with:
 Gudensberg, Germany
 Rtyně v Podkrkonoší, Czech Republic
 Shchyrets, Ukraine

References

Jelcz-Laskowice
Gmina Jelcz Laskowice